William Kennedy (1826) was an American Democratic-Republican Party politician from Sussex County. He served in the State Assembly 1804–06 and 1808–11 where he was Speaker for the 1810 and 1811 sessions.  He was elected to the New Jersey Legislative Council, the precursor to the New Jersey Senate, from 1813 to 1815. He served as Vice-President of Council from 1814 to 1815. In that capacity he was the acting governor of New Jersey from June 19, 1815, when Governor William Sanford Pennington resigned to become a federal judge, to October 26, 1815. He was succeeded as governor by Mahlon Dickerson.

Kennedy is excluded from many official listings, in spite of the fact that he acted as governor for about four months.

See also
List of governors of New Jersey

Notes and references

1775 births
1826 deaths
Governors of New Jersey
Members of the New Jersey Legislative Council
New Jersey Democratic-Republicans
Democratic-Republican Party state governors of the United States
People of colonial New Jersey
19th-century American politicians